Pappy is the nickname of:

 Pappy Boyington (1912–1988), American combat pilot who was a United States Marine Corps fighter ace during World War II
 Fred Coe (1914–1979), American television producer and director
 Pappy Daily (1902–1987), American country music record producer and entrepreneur
 Paul Gunn (1899–1957), United States naval aviator known mainly for his actions in the Second World War
 John C. Herbst (1909–1946), American flying ace who was officially the second highest-scoring fighter pilot in the China Burma India Theater
 J.C. Hoel (1904–1989), motorcycle racer, dealer, businessman, and founder of Sturgis Motorcycle Rally
 Pappy Kojo (born 989), Ghanaian hip hop and hiplife recording artist from Takoradi
 Duane S. Larson (1916–2005), American World War II fighter pilot
 Art Lewis (1911–1962), American football player and coach
 Howard Mason (born 1959), American drug trafficker and organized crime figure
 W. Lee O'Daniel (1890–1969), conservative Democratic politician from Texas
 Bob Papenbrook (1955–2006), American voice actor
 James “Pappy” Ricks (1927–2011), American basketball player for the New York Rens
 Paul Rowe (Canadian football) (1917–1990), Canadian professional football fullback
 Pappy Sherrill (born 1915), American Old Time and Bluegrass fiddler
 Pappy Stokes (1920–2006), professional golf caddie at the Augusta National Golf Club
 Risley C. Triche (1927–2012), attorney in Napoleonville, Louisiana, who served as a Democratic member of the Louisiana House of Representatives from 1955 to 1976
 Pappy Waldorf (1902–1981), American college football player and coach
 Pappy Wood (1888–1978), Canadian curler, and ice hockey, lacrosse and soccer player

Lists of people by nickname